Kazachinskoye is a rural locality (a selo) and the administrative center of Kazachinsko-Lensky District of Irkutsk Oblast, Russia. Population:  Kazachinskoye Airport is located nearby.

References

Notes

Sources

Rural localities in Irkutsk Oblast